Antalyaspor is a Turkish professional football club located in the city of Antalya. The club colours are red and white and they play their home matches at Antalya Arena. Domestically, the club has won the First League twice, in 1982 and 1986. They also finished as runners-up for the Turkish Cup in 2000.

Past seasons

League affiliation
Süper Lig: 1982–85, 1986–87, 1994–02, 2006–07, 2008–14, 2015–
TFF First League: 1966–82, 1985–86, 1987–94, 2002–06, 2007–08, 2014–15

References

Notes

seasons
Antalyaspor